Flatlands was a local service district in Addington Parish, Restigouche County, New Brunswick, Canada. The Duncan family of Aberdeen, Scotland were the original settlers of Flatlands and Campbellton. In 1866 Flatlands was a farming and lumbering settlement with approximately 27 resident families. In 1871, it had a population of 150. In 1898 Flatlands was a station on the Intercolonial Railway and had one post office, three stores, a shingle mill, a church and a population of about 400.

The population as of 2016 is 143 people.

Location 
Flatlands is located along the Restigouche River, opposite the Province of Quebec. It is approximately 5 km from Matapédia, Quebec, a 5-minute drive, and about 15 km from downtown Campbellton, New Brunswick, a 20-minute drive. Route 11 is the major highway running through the community, with a posted speed limit of 80 km/h.

References

Communities in Restigouche County, New Brunswick
Designated places in New Brunswick
Local service districts of Restigouche County, New Brunswick